Marlon Frank Davis (born November 2, 1986) is a former American football offensive lineman. He was signed by the Cleveland Browns as an undrafted free agent in 2009. He played college football at Alabama.

He has also been a member of the New York Jets.

Professional career

Cleveland Browns
Davis, a projected late round prospect, was not selected in the 2009 NFL draft. The Cleveland Browns signed Davis to a contract on May 1, 2009. Davis was waived by the Browns four months later as part of the Browns' final roster cuts.

New York Jets
The Jets signed Davis on May 13, 2010 before the team waived him on August 14, 2010. The team officially announced on January 26, 2011 that Davis had been signed to a future contract. On July 29, he was waived by the Jets.

References

External links
New York Jets bio
Crimson Tide bio

1986 births
Living people
Players of American football from Columbus, Georgia
Alabama Crimson Tide football players
Cleveland Browns players
New York Jets players